Gao Shangquan (September 10, 1929 – June 27, 2021) was a Chinese economist.

From 1985 to 1993, Gao was vice chairman of the National Economic System Reform Committee. From 1998 to 2003 he was a member of the 9th National Committee and director of the Chinese Society for Economic System Reform.

Until 2010, Gao was also Chairman of the Board of Directors of the Foundation for Research into Chinese Economic Reforms and Professor of Peking University and Dean of the Faculty of Management at Zhejiang University. His publications, "The Reform of China's Industrial System" (1987) and "Two Decades of Reform in China" (中国 改革 二 十年) (1999), exerted a decisive influence on the development of Chinese reform and opening-up policy.

References

1929 births
2021 deaths
Chinese economists
Economists from Shanghai